Lucasium bungabinna is a gecko endemic to Australia which is found in Western Australia and South Australia.

References

Lucasium
Reptiles described in 2008
Taxa named by Paul Doughty
Taxa named by Mark Norman Hutchinson
Geckos of Australia